opened in Itoshima, Fukuoka Prefecture, Japan in 2004. It supersedes the former , which opened in July 1987. With a focus on cultural properties excavated from the area, the museum's collection numbers some 19,500 objects. The display includes an assemblage of Yayoi-period artefacts excavated from the  that has been designated a National Treasure.

See also
 List of National Treasures of Japan (archaeological materials)
 Kyushu Historical Museum
 List of Historic Sites of Japan (Fukuoka)
 Itokoku

References

External links
 Itokoku History Museum

Itoshima, Fukuoka
History museums in Japan
Museums in Fukuoka Prefecture
Museums established in 1987
1987 establishments in Japan